An overhead crane, commonly called a bridge crane, is a type of crane found in industrial environments. An overhead crane consists of two parallel rails seated on longitudinal I-beams attached to opposite steel columns by means of brackets. The traveling bridge spans the gap. A hoist, the lifting component of a crane, travels along the bridge. If the bridge is rigidly supported on two or more legs running on two fixed rails at ground level, the crane is called a gantry crane (USA, ASME B30 series) or a goliath crane (UK, BS 466).

Unlike mobile or construction cranes, overhead cranes are typically used for either manufacturing or maintenance applications, where efficiency or downtime are critical factors.

History 
In 1876 Sampson Moore in England designed and supplied the first ever electric overhead crane, which was used to hoist guns at the Royal Arsenal in Woolwich, London. Since that time Alliance Machine, now defunct, holds an AISE citation for one of the earliest cranes in the USA market. This crane was in service until approximately 1980, and is now in a museum in Birmingham, Alabama. Over the years important innovations, such as the Weston load brake (which is now rare) and the wire rope hoist (which is still popular), have come and gone. The original hoist contained components mated together in what is now called the built-up style hoist.  These built up hoists are used for heavy-duty applications such as steel coil handling and for users desiring long life and better durability.  They also provide for easier maintenance. Now many hoists are package hoists, built as one unit in a single housing, generally designed for ten-year life, but the life calculation is based on an industry standard when calculating actual life. See the Hoists Manufacturers Institute site  for true life calculation, which is based on load and hours used. In today's modern world for the North American market, there are a few governing bodies for the industry. The Overhead Alliance is a group that represents Crane Manufacturers Association of America, Hoist Manufacturers Institute, and Monorail Manufacturers Association.  These product counsels of the Material Handling Industry of America have joined forces to create promotional materials to raise the awareness of the benefits of overhead lifting.  The members of this group are marketing representatives of the member companies.

Early manufacture 
 1830: First Crane company in Germany, Ludwig Stuckenholz company.
 1840: Mass production of overhead cranes starts in Germany.
 1854: Sampson Moore & Co in Liverpool, England patents a new winch mechanism that allowed the lifting of heavier weights (such as naval guns) by an electric motor.
 1861: The first steam powered overhead crane is installed by John Ramsbottom at the Crewe Railway workshops. Power was transmitted to the crane from a pulley driven by a stationary engine through an endless cotton rope.
 1887: The Ludwig Stuckenholz company introduces electrical components to overhead cranes, determining industry design.
 1910: The first mass-produced electric motor hoist starts in Germany.
Configurations:

While sharing major components, overhead cranes are manufactured in a number of configurations based on applications.

EOT (Electric Overhead Traveling) Crane 

EOT cranes are a common type of overhead crane. They are found in many factories and warehouses. These cranes are electrically operated by a control pendant, radio/IR remote pendant, or from an operator cabin attached to the crane.

Rotary overhead crane 
This type of overhead crane has one end of the bridge mounted on a fixed pivot and the other end carried on an annular track; the bridge traverses the circular area beneath. This offers improvement over a jib crane by making possible a longer reach and eliminating lateral strains on the building walls.

Applications 
Overhead cranes are commonly used in the refinement of steel and other metals, such as copper and aluminium. At every step of the manufacturing process, until it leaves a factory as a finished product, metal is handled by an overhead crane. Raw materials are poured into a furnace by crane, hot metal is then rolled to specific thickness and tempered or annealed, and then stored by an overhead crane for cooling, the finished coils are lifted and loaded onto trucks and trains by overhead crane, and the fabricator or stamper uses an overhead crane to handle the steel in his factory. The automobile industry uses overhead cranes to handle raw materials. Smaller workstation cranes, such as jib or gantry cranes, handle lighter loads in a work area, such as CNC mill or saw.

Almost all paper mills use bridge cranes for regular maintenance, needing removal of heavy press rolls and other equipment. The bridge cranes are used in the initial construction of paper machines because they make it easier to install the heavy cast iron paper drying drums and other massive equipment, some weighing as much as 70 tons.

In many instances, the cost of a bridge crane can be largely offset with savings from not renting mobile cranes in the construction of a facility that uses a lot of heavy process equipment.

Gallery

See also 
 Container crane
 Crane (railroad)
 Gantry crane
 EOT crane

References

Standards

 ASME B30.2: "Overhead and Gantry Cranes (Top Running Bridge, Single or Multiple Girder, Top Running Trolley Hoist)"
 ASME B30.17: "Overhead and Gantry Cranes (Top Running Bridge, Single Girder, Underhung Hoist)"
 ASME B30.11: "Monorails and Underhung Cranes"
 BS 466: "Specification for Power driven overhead travelling cranes, semi-goliath and goliath cranes for general use" (1984)
 ISO 4301-5: "Cranes; classification; part 5: overhead travelling and portal bridge cranes" (1991)
 ISO 8686-5: "Cranes; design principles for loads and load combinations; part 5: overhead travelling and portal bridge cranes" (1992)
 Indian Standard - 807
 Indian Standard - 3177
 Indian Standard -4137
 FEM 1.001: "Rules for the Design of Hoisting Appliances"

External links 
 OSHA Regs for overhead cranes

Lifting equipment
Cranes (machines)